Lazarevskaya is a rural locality (a village) in Kargopolsky District, Arkhangelsk Oblast, Russia. The population was 92 as of 2012. There are 2 streets.

Geography 
Lazarevskaya is located 33 km east of Kargopol (the district's administrative centre) by road. Stegnevskaya is the nearest rural locality.

References 

Rural localities in Kargopolsky District